Enrique Mac Iver Rodríguez (15 July 1844 – 21 August 1922) was a Chilean lawyer and politician. He participated in the 1891 Chilean Civil War on the side of the victorious Congressist faction doing himself the first draft for the deposition of president José Manuel Balmaceda. In 1898 he represented Chile in the Puna de Atacama dispute.

1844 births
1922 deaths
Members of the Senate of Chile
People from Constitución, Chile
Candidates for President of Chile
19th-century Chilean lawyers
20th-century Chilean lawyers
19th-century Chilean politicians
20th-century Chilean politicians